Bakyobageesh (বাক্যবাগীশ) is the third solo album by Indian singer-songwriter Anupam Roy. Girona Entertainment released this album on Durga Puja and Eid of 2014 in Kolkata and Dhaka. Later on 2017, Anupam Roy re-released this album with Anupam Roy Creations label.

Track listing
All songs sung, composed and written by Anupam Roy.

Personnel
Music produced by The Anupam Roy Band
 Anupam Roy – Singer-songwriter
 Sandipan Parial – Drums
 Nabarun Bose – Keyboards and Backing Vocals
 Roheet Mukherjee – Bass
 Subhodip Banerjee – Guitar
 Shomi Chatterjee – Mixed and mastered
Additional musicians:
 Sanjoy Das – Khamak (Babu Re)
 Rohan Roy – Violin (Ghawrkuno Ghash and Rajprasader Bondee)
 Joy Nandi – Tabla (Maatir Rawng)

References

2014 albums